In geometry, the triangular bipyramid (or dipyramid) is a type of hexahedron, being the first in the infinite set of face-transitive bipyramids. It is the dual of the triangular prism with 6 isosceles triangle faces.

As the name suggests, it can be constructed by joining two tetrahedra along one face. Although all its faces are congruent and the solid is face-transitive, it is not a Platonic solid because some vertices adjoin three faces and others adjoin four.

The bipyramid whose six faces are all equilateral triangles is one of the Johnson solids,.   As a Johnson solid with all faces equilateral triangles, it is also a deltahedron.

Formulae 

The following formulae for the height, surface area and volume can be used if all faces are regular, with edge length :

Dual polyhedron 
The dual polyhedron of the triangular bipyramid is the triangular prism, with five faces: two parallel equilateral triangles linked by a chain of three rectangles.
Although the triangular prism has a form that is a uniform polyhedron (with square faces), the dual of the Johnson solid form of the bipyramid has rectangular rather than square faces, and is not uniform.

Related polyhedra and honeycombs
The triangular bipyramid, dt{2,3}, can be in sequence rectified, rdt{2,3}, truncated, {2,3} and alternated (snubbed), {2,3}:

The triangular bipyramid can be constructed by augmentation of smaller ones, specifically two stacked regular octahedra with 3 triangular bipyramids added around the sides, and 1 tetrahedron above and below. This polyhedron has 24 equilateral triangle faces, but it is not a Johnson solid because it has coplanar faces. It is a coplanar 24-triangle deltahedron. This polyhedron exists as the augmentation of cells in a gyrated alternated cubic honeycomb. Larger triangular polyhedra can be generated similarly, like 9, 16 or 25 triangles per larger triangle face, seen as a section of a triangular tiling.

The triangular bipyramid can form a tessellation of space with octahedra or with truncated tetrahedra.

When projected onto a sphere, it resembles a compound of a trigonal hosohedron and trigonal dihedron. It is part of an infinite series of dual pair compounds of regular polyhedra projected onto spheres. The triangular bipyramid can be referred to as a deltoidal hexahedron for consistency with the other solids in the series, although the "deltoids" are triangles instead of kites in this case, as the angle from the dihedron is 180 degrees.

See also
 Trigonal bipyramidal molecular geometry
 Boerdijk–Coxeter helix, an extension of the triangular bipyramid by adding more tetrahedrons

References

External links
 
Conway Notation for Polyhedra Try: dP3

Johnson solids
Deltahedra
Pyramids and bipyramids
Molecular geometry